1991 Rudrapur bombings were bombings by the suspected terrorists in 1991 in Rudrapur city in Indian state of Uttarakhand. Two bombs were exploded on 17 October 1991. The first bomb exploded when people were watching Ramlila in the public ground. After 15 minutes the second bomb went off near the hospital where injured were being taken. The bombings killed more than 40 people and injuring 140 people. Later BSTK and the Khalistan National Army claimed the responsibility for the bombings.

It was one of the most significant incidents of the region to employ an IED for the explosion.

References

Mass murder in 1991
Terrorist incidents in India in 1991
History of Uttarakhand (1947–present)
Rudrapur, Uttarakhand
Improvised explosive device bombings in India
Insurgency in Punjab
Crime in Uttarakhand
Sikh terrorism in India